The Merdeka Palace (also known in Indonesian as Istana Gambir and during the Dutch colonial times as Paleis te Koningsplein), is one of six presidential palaces in Indonesia. It is located on the north side of the Merdeka Square in Central Jakarta, Indonesia and is used as the official residence of the president of the Republic of Indonesia.

The palace was a residence for the governor-general of the Dutch East Indies during the colonial era. In 1949, the palace was renamed Merdeka Palace, "(ke)merdeka(an)" meaning "freedom" or "independence".

The Merdeka Palace is part of the  Jakarta Presidential Palace Complex, which also includes the Negara Palace, Wisma Negara (state guest house), Sekretariat Negara (State Secretariat), and the Bina Graha building. It is the center of the Indonesian executive authority.

History

The beginning

The building that is now the Merdeka Palace was built in the premise of the Rijswijk Palace (present Istana Negara) when it was considered no longer sufficed for administrative purposes e.g. big receptions and conferences during the mid-19th-century. In 1869, the instruction to construct a new palace was given by Governor-General Pieter Mijer. Construction took place on the south lawn of the Rijswijk Palace on 23 March 1873 during the tenure of Governor-General James Loudon.

The Neo-Palladian palace was designed by Jacobus Bartholomeus Drossaers and was built by the Department of Public Works and the contracting firm Drossaers & Company at a cost of ƒ 360,000. The new building was built in southern part of the Rijswijk Palace grounds, directly facing Koningsplein (now Merdeka Square).

Construction of the palace was finished in 1879 during the tenure of Governor-General Johan Wilhelm van Lansberge. The new palace was given the official name Paleis van de Gouverneur Generaal ("Palace of the Governor-General"), the official residence of the governor-general of the Dutch East Indies and his family.

Governor-General Johan Wilhelm van Lansberge (1875–1881) was the first to reside in the building. Governor-General Tjarda van Starkenborgh Stachouwer (1936–1942) was the last Dutch governor-general to reside in the Palace.

Japanese occupation
During the Japanese occupation of Indonesia (1942–1945), the Army Commander of the Japanese garrison resided in the Rijswijk Palace compound. Three Japanese commanders have taken residence in the Merdeka Palace.

Post-independence
The Indonesian national revolution (1945–1949) ended with the Netherlands' recognition of the Republic of Indonesia. The Indonesian declaration of independence from the Dutch in 1949 was announced in Gambir Palace. During the ceremony, the Dutch flag was substituted with the flag of Indonesia. Many spectators were rejoicing when the flag was hoisted, and yelled "Merdeka! (Freedom!)". From that moment, Gambir Palace became known as Merdeka Palace. Tony Lovink, the high commissioner of the Dutch Crown was the last man representing the Dutch power to leave the palace. The name of the palace officially changed to Istana Merdeka ("Indendepence Palace") on 28 December 1949 at 17.55 hours.

On 27 December 1949, a day after the ceremony, President Sukarno and his family arrived from Yogyakarta. For the first time, the president of the Republic of Indonesia settled in Merdeka Palace.

The first annual Independence Day ceremony was held at the Merdeka Palace in 1950.

Evolution of the Merdeka Palace
The building has remain unchanged since the building was finished in 1879. After the Indonesian independence, the Merdeka Palace compound was expanded to include not only Istana Negara (State Palace), but also to construct Wisma Negara, Sekretariat Negara (State Sectreatiat) and Bina Graha. Several colonial buildings and residences were demolished in the Weltevreden area to make way for today's State Palace compound.

A small octagonal gazebo located in the courtyard of the palace was used as private school for Sukarno's and the palace staff's children. This gazebo was previously used by Dutch colonial officials as muziekkoepel (music gazebo), where music performances were played during formal balls.

When Suharto became president of Indonesia, he made changes to the previously residential function of the palace. Sukarno's bedroom was converted into Ruang Bendera Pusaka (Regalia Room) and the room of Sukarno's wife Fatmawati became the president's bedroom. An old wooden building in the palace complex known as "Sanggar" was demolished to make way for the Puri Bhakti Renatama building, and was used as a museum to store valuable artifacts, artwork and gifts from foreign emissaries. Later he also built the Bina Graha building on the palace grounds, which he used as his office.

When Megawati took office, she had the Puri Bhakti Renatama building converted into the President's office, while its contents moved to Bina Graha building. She also restored the furniture and decorations of the palace back to the way it was under Sukarno. Suharto's Jepara wood carving furniture was removed, with the exception of the Ruang Jepara (Jepara Room, as a reminder of Suharto's regime), and replaced with the old colonial refurbishment.

The Merdeka Palace now

The Merdeka Palace serves as an official venue for state events such as the Independence Day ceremony, welcoming (foreign) dignitaries, cabinet meetings, state banquets and reception of letters of credence from foreign ambassadors. Additionally, it still contains the president's private quarters and offices.

The administrative role that the palace once had, has been shifted to the State Palace and State Secretariat, while the Merdeka Palace remains a symbol of authority.

Layout of the Palace
A 17 m tall flagpole and a fountain are located on the front lawn of the Merdeka Palace. The annual flag raising ceremony takes place during the Indonesian Independence day on 17 August. During the Independence ceremony, the veranda is often used as a ceremonial stage for the President and dignitaries.

Notable rooms in the Palace include:
Ruang Kredensial (credential hall) provides entrance to the palace and is the place where most diplomatic activities are conducted, such as receiving state guests and ambassadors. The credential hall is decorated with furniture that dates back to the colonial days, as well as paintings and ceramic works.
Ruang Jepara (Jepara room) was a former study room of Sukarno, and named after the Central Javanese town of Jepara, source of the room's carved wooden furniture and ornaments.
Ruang Raden Saleh (Raden Saleh room) is located in front of Ruang Jepara. The room was previously used as the First Lady's office and living room. Megawati used the room to store 5 paintings by Indonesian painter Raden Saleh.
Ruang Resepsi (reception room) is the largest room of the palace. It is usually used for state banquets, state gala dinners, national meetings, and cultural performances. There are two paintings of Basuki Abdullah. On the eastern wall hangs "Pergiwa Pergiwati", a painting theme from Mahabharata, and on the west wall hangs the Javanese "Jaka Tarub" painting.
Ruang Bendera Pusaka (the heirloom flag room), or Regalia room. The room is used to store "Bendera Pusaka", the first Indonesian flag that was raised during Indonesian Declaration of Independence on 17 August 1945.

The presidents after Sukarno no longer use the palace as a residence, although it is still the official presidential residence. The palace's offices are still in use by the current Indonesian president. During the Suharto administration, Suharto preferred to reside in his own house at Jalan Cendana, Menteng, while the palace and Bina Graha only served as his office. The palace once again became the official presidential residence during the Abdurrahman Wahid and Megawati administrations. Susilo Bambang Yudhoyono sometimes resides in Merdeka Palace, however just like Suharto, he often prefers to reside in his own house, at Puri Cikeas, Gunung Putri district of Bogor Regency – West Java, south of Jakarta.

Changing of the guard
Since 17 July 2016, the changing of the guard ceremony by the Paspampres has been opened to the public. It is held at 8 am on every last Sunday of the month in front of the palace yard.

See also

Bogor Palace, main residence of the governor-general and another presidential palace.
Cipanas Palace
Gedung Agung
Vice Presidential Palace (Indonesia)
Official residence

References

Cited works

External links

Istana Merdeka profile (in Indonesian)
Istana Merdeka history (in Indonesian)

Presidential palaces in Indonesia
Colonial architecture in Jakarta
Cultural Properties of Indonesia in Jakarta
Architecture in Indonesia
Landhuizen
Central Jakarta
State guesthouses
Buildings and structures completed in 1873